Giuseppe Romele (born 12 February 1992) is an Italian para cross-country skier who represented Italy at the 2022 Winter Paralympics.

Career
Romele competed at the 2021 World Para Snow Sports Championships and won a silver medal in the 10 kilometre sitting event.

He represented Italy at the 2022 Winter Paralympics and won a bronze medal in the 10 kilometre sitting event.

References 

Living people
1992 births
People from Lovere
Cross-country skiers at the 2022 Winter Paralympics
Medalists at the 2022 Winter Paralympics
Paralympic bronze medalists for Italy
Paralympic medalists in cross-country skiing
Sportspeople from the Province of Bergamo